Francotiradores 2 (English: "Snipers 2") is a 2001 album by Master Joe & O.G. Black. It was the second part of Francotiradores.
It was peaked at 35 in Top Latin Albums and 19 in Latin Pop Albums.

Track listing 
 "Intro El Francotirador" (DJ Blass)
 "Por Envidiarme"
 "Lento"
 "Lo Tendrás Que Hacer" (feat. Baby Rasta & Gringo)
 "Bailen, Yackien"
 "¿Señora Por Qué?"
 "El Fake De La Esperanza" (O.G. Black solo) (diss to Tempo)
 "Celosa"
 "El Aroma De Tu Piel"
 "Sorpresa" (feat. Maicol & Manuel)
 "Ya No Se Ven" (Master Joe solo)
 "Dime La Que Hay"
 "Nuevo Disco, Nuevo Año"
 "¿Quieres Ser Mi Gata?" (feat. Jenay)
 "Legalicen"
 "Boom" (feat. Frankie Boy)
 "Francotiradores" (feat. Jenay, Blade Pacino) (diss to Tempo)

References

2001 albums
Pina Records albums
Master Joe & O.G. Black albums